"I Go to Sleep" is a song written by Ray Davies which has been covered by numerous artists. Peggy Lee, Cher and the Applejacks recorded covers in 1965 without chart success. The Pretenders released a cover in 1981 which reached number seven on the UK Singles Chart.

Background and Ray Davies's demo 

Working on the piano at his parents' home in Fortis Green, north London, he wrote the song while awaiting news about the birth of his and his wife's first child. The following day, the song was one of seven for which he recorded demos at Regent Sound Studios in central London. The recording features a solo vocal from Davies while he plays piano.

The Kinks never formally recorded the song. Band biographer Johnny Rogan considers the lack of a Kinks recording strange, since the material they recorded around the same time was "obviously inferior". Davies's demo remained unreleased until April1998, when it appeared as a bonus track on the CD remaster of Kinda Kinks. Sanctuary Records later included it on the 2014 box set The Kinks Anthology 1964–1971.

Cover versions

Early covers 

In June1965, during the Kinks' first US tour, publisher Edward Kassner shopped Davies's song catalogue to various artists. He succeeded in convincing American jazz singer Peggy Lee to cover "I Go to Sleep", which she recorded backed by a studio orchestra conducted by Sid Feller. Capitol Records included the song on Lee's 1965 album Then Was Then – Now Is Now!, and the label also released it as a single, though it failed to chart.

During the same US tour, after a Kinks show in Philadelphia on 19June, singer Mary Wells expressed to Davies a desire to record the song, but he rejected the offer since it had already been promised to Lee. Around 30June, as American singer Cher finished recording her debut album at Gold Star Studios, Larry Page talked her into recording the song as well. It failed to chart.

German singer Marion (de) (later known as Marion Maerz) covered the song in 1967. Page produced the record in London. The song was released in West Germany and the UK. Marion performed this song as the first and only German female singer in the famous German music program Beat Club.

The Pretenders 

"I Go to Sleep" was covered in 1981 by The Pretenders and released as a single from their second studio album Pretenders II.

"I Go to Sleep" had been rumoured to have been one of the first songs that Chrissie Hynde ever learned. At the time of the song's recording, Hynde had been dating Davies, whom she had met after covering the Kinks track "Stop Your Sobbing." The song features "a very strong late-'50s pop feel and flavor" according to Allmusic's Matthew Greenwald. The song also includes a French horn part; "The French horn in 'I Go to Sleep'…" Hynde recalled, "It's those little embellishments that capture my attention."

Notes

References

Sources 

 
 
 
 

1965 songs
1965 singles
The Pretenders songs
Songs written by Ray Davies
Song recordings produced by Shel Talmy
Peggy Lee songs
The Kinks songs
Decca Records singles
Sire Records singles
1981 singles
Sia (musician) songs